Nigor may refer to:

 Negur, a city in Iran, alternatively known as Nigor
 Negar-e Bala, a village in Iran, alternatively known as Nigor

See also
 Niger (disambiguation)